The Conquest is a 2011 French Biographical film on Nicolas Sarkozy directed by Xavier Durringer.

Plot 
On May 6, 2007, Nicolas Sarkozy, between two phone calls to his wife Cécilia, remembers the past five years. In 2002, he returned to the forefront of political life by being appointed interior minister by President of the Republic, Jacques Chirac, in the government of Jean-Pierre Raffarin. Gradually, he managed to make a name and decided to prepare to succeed President Chirac at the Elysee in 2007. However, he must cope with significant challenges as his rivalry with the Foreign Minister, Dominique de Villepin, or the secret romance with Cecilia advertising Richard Attias and his affair with the journalist Anne Fulda.

Cast 

 Denis Podalydès as Nicolas Sarkozy
 Florence Pernel as Cécilia Sarkozy
 Bernard Le Coq as Jacques Chirac
 Michèle Moretti as Bernadette Chirac
 Hippolyte Girardot as Claude Guéant
 Samuel Labarthe as Dominique de Villepin
 Emmanuel Noblet as Bruno Le Maire
 Pierre Cassignard as Frédéric Lefebvre
 Michel Bompoil as Henri Guaino
 Saïda Jawad as Rachida Dati
 Gérard Chaillou as Jean-Louis Debré
 Yann Babilée as Richard Attias
 Laurent Claret as Philippe Rondot
 Dominique Daguier as Jean-Louis Gergorin
 Grégory Fitoussi as Laurent Solly
 Dominique Besnehard as Pierre Charon
 Nicolas Moreau as Pierre Giacometti
 Jérémie Fontaine as Louis Sarkozy
 Mathias Mlekuz as Franck Louvrier
 Fabrice Cals as Michaël Darmon
 Laurent Olmedo as Philippe Ridet
 Bruno López as Jean-François Achilli
 Jean-Pierre Léonardini as Bruno Jeudy
 Marine Royer as Delphine Byrka
 Monica Abularach as Elodie Grégoire

Production

The movie was presented the same day of its release date to the 2011 Cannes Film Festival, on May 18, 2011.

Critical reception
The movie was well received by the critics. , the film holds a 77% approval rating on review aggregator Rotten Tomatoes, based on 31 reviews with an average rating of 6.4 out of 10. Metacritic gave the film a score of 62 out of 100, based on 14 critics.

Accolades

References

External links 
 

2011 films
French biographical drama films
Biographical films about presidents
Films about elections
2007 French presidential election
Nicolas Sarkozy
Films scored by Nicola Piovani
Films directed by Xavier Durringer
2010s French films